El Toro Hydroelectric Plant  is a hydroelectric power station in Bío Bío Region, Chile. The plant uses water from Laja River and produces  of electricity.

References

Energy infrastructure completed in 1973
Energy infrastructure in Biobío Region
Hydroelectric power stations in Chile
1973 establishments in Chile